Christopher Doran (born 22 November 1979) is an Irish singer from Waterford. He was the winner of Ireland's You're a Star 2003-2004 talent search competition to find Ireland's Eurovision Song Contest entry. The competition held auditions throughout Ireland, and the winners went through to the final stages, with one act eventually decided on. The show was aired on RTÉ. He went on to represent Ireland in the Eurovision Song Contest 2004 with "If My World Stopped Turning".

Eurovision 2004 
Chris Doran won the competition You're a Star with his song "If My World Stopped Turning"  Doran sang the song accompanied onstage by singing group Final 4, who had also participated in the competition.

Doran, along with Final 4, represented Ireland in the Eurovision Song Contest 2004, in Istanbul, Turkey in May 2004 with the song "If My World Stopped Turning" finishing 22nd out of 24. 

The single however became a big hit in Ireland, where it topped the charts for two weeks.

Recent career 
Doran went on to release a number of other singles, scoring five Irish hits in total. He also released an album in 2004. He was on the judging panel for a reality talent show, entitled "Sony Centre Star Search", on Waterford's WLR FM in 2006. He has also completed some recording work in the United States, having worked with producer Joe Staxx.

Personal life 
Chris Doran was born into a large family of the travelling community. His father died when he was a year old. Doran became a kickboxer in his youth and won many awards for this. He also worked as a builder before his music career took off.

In June 2013 Chris Doran was one of eight people brought to a special sitting of Carrick-on-Suir district court following a row on a street in Carrick-on-Suir and was charged with affray.

Discography

Albums

Singles

References

External links 
Chris Doran Myspace Music

1979 births
Living people
Irish pop singers
Eurovision Song Contest entrants for Ireland
Eurovision Song Contest entrants of 2004
People from County Waterford
Singing talent show winners
You're a Star contestants
21st-century Irish male  singers